Raphael Davis (born September 1, 1976) is an American mixed martial artist who has fought for Bellator FC and M-1 Global.

MMA career

Early career and M-1 Challenge
Davis started his career in 2006, fighting mainly for Californian organizations. With a record of four wins and one loss, he signed with M-1 Challenge, a competition organized by M-1 Global.

He fought twice for M-1, defeating Jair Gonçalves and Jae Young Kim.

In 2010, with a record of 8-1 and victories over fighters like the TUF 8 finalist Vinny Magalhães and the MFC former light heavyweight champion Emanuel Newton, he signed with Bellator.

Bellator Fighting Championships

Davis made his debut on June 17, 2010, at Bellator 22 against Demetrius Richards. He won via submission in the very first round.

Davis faced the former KOTC champion Tony Lopez on October 28, 2010, at Bellator 34. He won via unanimous decision (30-27, 30–27, 30–27).

Davis faced D.J. Linderman on March 26, 2011, at Bellator 38 in the quarterfinal match of the season four light heavyweight tournament. After taking a significant amount of damage, Davis fallen via TKO in the third round.

Davis faced Myron Dennis on October 8, 2011, at Bellator 53. He won via KO in the second round.

World Series of Fighting
In October 2013, it was announced that Davis signed a multi-fight deal with World Series of Fighting.

Arrest

In April 2012, Davis was arrested at his home in Lomita, California by the Los Angeles County District Attorney's investigators for suspicion of fraudulent claims of workers' compensation from December 2008 to May 2011, while competing in seven professional mixed martial arts matches during this time. He was held on $30,000 bail and was released the following day.

In September 2012, Davis pleaded guilty before the superior court to one felony count of filing a false workers’ compensation claim. The other three counts were dropped as a result of the plea and Davis had to complete 200 hours of community service. He was sentenced to three years of probation in March 2013.

Mixed martial arts record

|-
|Loss
|align=center|13–3 
|Jason Brilz
|Decision (split)
| Titan FC 28: Brilz vs. Davis
|
|align=center|3
|align=center|5:00
|Newkirk, Oklahoma, United States
|
|-
|Win
|align=center|13–2
|Edward Darby
|TKO (punches)
|Xplode Fight Series: Creation
|
|align=center|2
|align=center|0:38
|Valley Center, California, United States
|
|-
|Win
|align=center|12–2
|Berin Balijagic
|TKO (punches)
|SHC 5: Llorent vs. Reljic
|
|align=center|2
|align=center|1:26
|Geneva, Switzerland
|
|-
|Win
|align=center|11–2
|Myron Dennis
|KO (punch)
|Bellator 53
|
|align=center|2
|align=center|0:29
|Miami, Oklahoma, United States
|
|-
|Loss
|align=center|10–2
|D.J. Linderman
|TKO (punches)
|Bellator 38
|
|align=center|3
|align=center|3:40
|Tunica, Mississippi, United States
|Bellator Season 4 Light Heavyweight Tournament Quarterfinal
|-
|Win
|align=center|10–1
|Tony Lopez
|Decision (unanimous)
|Bellator 34
|
|align=center|3
|align=center|5:00
|Hollywood, Florida, United States
|
|-
|Win
|align=center|9–1
|Demetrius Richards
|Submission (armbar)
|Bellator 22
|
|align=center|1
|align=center|2:51
|Kansas City, Missouri, United States
|
|-
|Win
|align=center|8–1
|Nikolai Onikienko
|Submission (armbar)
|FEFoMP: Mayor's Cup 2010
|
|align=center|1
|align=center|3:40
|Khabarovsk, Russia
|
|-
|Win
|align=center|7–1
|Emanuel Newton
|Submission (rear-naked choke)
|Called Out MMA 1
|
|align=center|2
|align=center|N/A
|Ontario, California, United States
|
|-
|Win
|align=center|6–1
|Jae Young Kim
|TKO (submission to punches)
|M-1 Challenge 14: Japan
|
|align=center|2
|align=center|3:45
|Tokyo, Japan
|
|-
|Win
|align=center|5–1
|Jair Goncalves
|TKO (punches)
|M-1 Challenge 12: USA
|
|align=center|1
|align=center|4:05
|Tacoma, Washington, United States
|
|-
|Win
|align=center|4–1
|Brandon Michaels
|Submission
|Total Fighting Alliance 13
|
|align=center|1
|align=center|0:22
|Long Beach, California, United States
|
|-
|Win
|align=center|3–1
|Vinny Magalhães
| TKO (submission to punches)
|Valor Fighting: Fight Night
|
|align=center|2
|align=center|3:03
|Tustin, California, United States
|
|-
|Win
|align=center|2–1
|Kawika Morton
|Submission (choke)
|CCFC: Total Elimination
|
|align=center|1
|align=center|N/A
|Santa Rosa, California, United States
|
|-
|Loss
|align=center|1–1
|Brent Beauparlant
|Decision (unanimous)
|IFL: Gracie vs. Miletich
|
|align=center|3
|align=center|4:00
|Moline, Illinois, United States
|
|-
|Win
|align=center|1–0
|Mike Martelle
|TKO (strikes)
|Cage of Fire 2
|
|align=center|1
|align=center|N/A
|Tijuana, Baja California, Mexico
|

References

1976 births
Living people
American male mixed martial artists
Light heavyweight mixed martial artists
People from Lomita, California